The Berza is a small tributary of the Danube in Călărași County, Romania. It passes through Lake Gălățui, and discharges into the Danube near Bogata, west of Călărași.

References

Rivers of Romania
Rivers of Călărași County